Down 'n Dirty is an 2000 American action film directed by and starring Fred Williamson as Dakota Smith. It also stars Bubba Smith, Gary Busey, Tony Lo Bianco, Beverly Johnson, Randy J. Goodwin, David Carradine, and Charles Napier.

Plot
Dakota Smith is a tough cop who tries to track down his partner's killers. In the course of Smith's quest to find the killers of his partner, he discovers that the chain goes right up from the lower regions of the police department to city government. Along the way, Smith teams up Nick Gleem, a timid photographer.

Production
The film was produced by Fred Williamson, Linda Williamson and Roger Mende. The soundtrack was created by Johnny Ross. One of the stars in the film, Bubba Smith, had formerly played for the Baltimore Colts and had appeared in the Police Academy films.

References

External links
 
 
 Down 'n Dirty trailer

American action films
2001 action films
2001 films
Films directed by Fred Williamson
2000s English-language films
2000s American films